Doyle Lee Tackett (August 23, 1923 – September 7, 2002) was an American football halfback.

Tackett was born in Hector, Arkansas, in 1923 and attended Atkins High School in Atkins, Arkansas. He did not play college football.

During World War II, Tackett served in the Navy. In 1944 and 1945, he starred at the halfback and fullback positions on the Navy's Fleet City Bluejackets football team in San Francisco. The undefeated 1945 Fleet City team featured an all-star lineup that included Tackett, Bruiser Kinard, Bill Daddio, Charlie O'Rourke, Steve Juzwik, Lou Zontini, and John Badaczewski, and was considered to be as good as the 1945 Army Cadets football team. 

He played in the All-America Football Conference for the Brooklyn Dodgers from 1946 to 1948.  He appeared in 27 games, five of them as a starter, and caught 10 passes 216 receiving yards and two touchdowns. 

He died in 2002 in Atkins, Arkansas.

References

1923 births
2002 deaths
American football halfbacks
Brooklyn Dodgers (AAFC) players
Players of American football from Arkansas
United States Navy personnel of World War II